Donville-les-Bains is a commune in the Manche department, northwestern France.

Introduction
Donville-les-Bains is located just outside Granville, a port on the Norman coast noted for ferry traffic to the Channel Islands. Rail service is available from Granville to Paris on a regular basis provided by SNCF, the French National Railway.

The town is also the origin of the English language surname Dunville/Dumville (originally Donville), which is found throughout the UK and former British colonies. People descended from this Norman line can be found in concentrations around Toronto, Thunder Bay, Chicago, Detroit, St. Louis, and South Carolina. (However, Dunville, Newfoundland was not named after Donville-les-Bains; Dunville was named after the founding Dunphy family.)

Heraldry

See also
Communes of the Manche department

References

Donvillelesbains
Populated coastal places in France